Paul Charruau (born 12 July 1993) is a French professional footballer who plays as a goalkeeper for  club Amiens.

Club career
Born in Paris, Charruau joined Valenciennes FC's youth setup in 2009. He first appeared as a senior with the reserves in 2011, and signed a professional deal on 30 May 2013.

Charruau made his professional debut on 29 August, starting in a 2–1 away win against AJ Auxerre for the Ligue 2 championship.

In July 2016, Charruau signed a two-year deal with SC Bastia. In January 2017 he was loaned to Paris FC in a swap deal for Alexis Thébaux, with SC Bastia manager François Ciccolini stating in a press conference that this was a disciplinary matter.

In June 2017, SC Bastia were administratively relegated to Championnat National and Charruau left the club. He signed for Red Star in February 2018, having been without a club in the intervening period.

On 29 June 2022, Charruau joined Amiens on a one-season deal.

References

External links
 
 
 

1993 births
Living people
French footballers
Footballers from Paris
Association football goalkeepers
France youth international footballers
Ligue 1 players
Ligue 2 players
Championnat National players
Valenciennes FC players
SC Bastia players
Paris FC players
Red Star F.C. players
Amiens SC players